Yulin Subdistrict is a subdistrict in Wuhou District, Chengdu, Sichuan, China. , it has eight residential communities under its administration.

See also
 List of township-level divisions of Sichuan

References

Township-level divisions of Sichuan
Geography of Chengdu